Little Hadham is a village and civil parish in the district of East Hertfordshire, Hertfordshire, England. At the census of 2001 it had a population of 1,081, increasing to 1,153 at the 2011 Census. It is bypassed by the A120 road, which connects it to the nearby town of Bishop's Stortford. The civil parish includes the hamlets of Bury Green, Church End, Cradle End, Green Street and Hadham Ford.  Little Hadham, together with the neighbouring village of Much Hadham, are collectively known as The Hadhams.

The rural village is situated on the banks of the River Ash and is characterised by half-timbered houses. The medieval parish church, dedicated to Saint Cecilia, was reconstructed in the late 14th or 15th century. The Bishop of London is the patron of the church.

Hadham Hall

It was bought by Sir William Capel, who served twice as Lord Mayor of London, in 1503-4 and 1510. The family seat remained at Rayne, until the 1570s, when Sir Henry Capell built a new house at Little Hadham, replacing the old hall. In 1578, Sir Henry Capell welcomed Queen Elizabeth I of England as a guest at Hadham Hall; an account of the time records her visit to "Mayster Kapel's, where was excellente good cheere and entertaynement." Arthur Capell (1608–1649) was a noted member of Parliament who was raised to the Peerage as Baron Capell of Hadham in 1641. In 1627, Arthur Capell married Elizabeth Morrison, daughter of Sir Charles Morrison, and heir to the Cassiobury Estate in Watford, and the Capell family became closely associated with Cassiobury. Capell supported the Royalist cause in the English Civil War, and was condemned to death by the Parliamentarians, beheaded in May 1649. One of Capell's last requests was for his heart to be buried with the body of King Charles I of England, and after his execution, Capell's heart was preserved in a silver box.

In 1661, after the Restoration, Arthur Capell's son, also called Arthur Capell, became the first Earl of Essex.  The new Earl commissioned a lavish reconstruction of his father's Tudor mansion, Cassiobury House, around 1677–1680, and he moved the family seat to Cassiobury. Meanwhile, the silver box containing the late Arthur Capell's heart, had remained in the safekeeping of the Bishop of Winchester, and the Bishop presented it to the new king, Charles II of England. In 1703, a heart in a silver box was found at Hadham Hall, suggesting that the King sent the heart to Capell's son. It was later taken to Cassiobury, but since the dissolution and sale of the Cassiobury estate, the whereabouts of Capell's heart are now unknown. A memorial stone to Lord Capell is in St Cecilia's Church in Little Hadham.

After the move to Watford, Hadham Hall fell into disrepair and was partly demolished, although it was retained by the Capell family, and the estate continued to be farmed by tenant farmers. The Capells used the hall to entertain important guests, such as King William III of England, who visited in April 1698. The hall was refurbished, around 1720, in the Queen Anne style. In 1900, Algernon George de Vere Capel, the 8th Earl of Essex (1884–1966), sold the Hall and the accompanying land to a London merchant, William Minet, who set about restoring the hall. In 1948, Hadham Hall was sold to the Hertfordshire County Council, who converted the building into a school.  The school closed in 1990, and merged with the Margaret Dane school to form Birchwood High School in Bishop’s Stortford. Hadham Hall, now a private residence, is a Grade II* listed building.

The Angel
One of its notable features is "The Angel", a former pub once inhabited by the folk rock group Fairport Convention and after which their album Angel Delight was titled. Violinist Dave Swarbrick, guitarists Richard Thompson, Simon Nicol and Dave Pegg, and drummer Dave Mattacks were resident in the building, along with their wives and the band's road crew. Members of the band supported the local community by playing at charity concerts to raise money for the church organ or the Police Orphans Fund. Nick Drake also visited the premises when making his first albums (Dave Pegg and Dave Mattacks of Fairport Convention played bass and drums respectively on these). The band's residence there ended in February 1971 when a lorry crashed into the Angel, severely damaging the property and destroying Swarbrick's bedroom. The lorry driver was killed in the accident, but nobody else was hurt.

See also
The Hundred Parishes

References

External links

 
Villages in Hertfordshire
Civil parishes in Hertfordshire
East Hertfordshire District